The 2000 United States Senate election in Montana was held November 7, 2000. Incumbent Republican U.S. Senator Conrad Burns won re-election to a third term. , this is the last time that a Republican has won Montana's class 1 Senate seat.

Democratic primary

Candidates 
 Brian Schweitzer, farmer and former United States Department of Agriculture employee
 John Driscoll, former Speaker of the Montana House of Representatives

Results

Republican primary

Candidates 
 Conrad Burns, incumbent U.S. Senator

Results

Reform primary

Candidates 
 Sam Rankin

Results 

Though Sam Rankin won the Reform Party's nomination for the United States Senate, he dropped out of the race over the summer and was replaced by Gary Lee.

General election

Candidates 
 Conrad Burns (R), incumbent U.S. Senator
 Gary Lee (Re)
 Brian Schweitzer (D), farmer and former United States Department of Agriculture employee

Campaign 
Burns, in a poll released September 21, was leading Schweitzer 48% to 39% that went down from 49% in November 1999. Schweitzer had his polls go up by 11 points.

Burns faced a surprisingly difficult reelection campaign in 2000. In February 1999, he announced that he would break his 1988 promise to only hold office for two terms, claiming "Circumstances have changed, and I have rethought my position." Later that same month, while giving a speech about U.S. dependence on foreign oil to the Montana Equipment Dealers Association, he referred to Arabs as "ragheads". Burns soon apologized, saying he "became too emotionally involved" during the speech.

Burns faced Brian Schweitzer, a rancher from Whitefish, Montana. While Burns attempted to link Schweitzer with presidential candidate Al Gore, whom Schweitzer never met, Schweitzer "effectively portrayed himself as nonpolitical". Schweitzer primarily challenged Burns on the issue of prescription drugs, organizing busloads of senior citizens to take trips to Canada and Mexico for cheaper medicine. Burns charged that Schweitzer favored "Canadian-style government controls" and claimed that senior citizens went to doctors to have "somebody to visit with. There's nothing wrong with them." Burns also faced trouble regarding deaths from asbestos in Libby, Montana. While he initially supported a bill to limit compensation in such cases, he withdrew his support for the bill, under public criticism, and added $11.5 million for the town to an appropriations bill.

Burns spent twice as much money as Schweitzer on the election and only defeated him by a slim margin, 51-47 percent, while the state voted 58-33 percent for Republican presidential nominee George W. Bush. Schweitzer went on to become governor in 2004.

Debates
Complete video of debate, October 10, 2000
Complete video of debate, October 16, 2000
Complete video of debate, October 21, 2000

Results

See also 
 2000 United States Senate elections

References

External links 
Official campaign websites (Archived)
 Conrad Burns (R)
 Brian Schweitzer (D)

Montana
2000
2000 Montana elections